Euanthe , also known as , is a retrograde irregular satellite of Jupiter. It was discovered by a team of astronomers from the University of Hawaii led by Scott S. Sheppard in 2001, and given the temporary designation .

Euanthe is about 3 kilometres in diameter, and orbits Jupiter at an average distance of 20,465 Mm in 602.81 days, at an inclination of 143° to the ecliptic (142° to Jupiter's equator) with an eccentricity of 0.2001.

It was named in August 2003 after Euanthe, who was the mother of the Graces, according to some Greek writers.

Euanthe belongs to the Ananke group, retrograde irregular moons that orbit Jupiter between 19.3 and 22.7 Gm, at inclinations of roughly 150°.

References

Ananke group
Moons of Jupiter
Irregular satellites
Discoveries by Scott S. Sheppard
Astronomical objects discovered in 2001
Moons with a retrograde orbit